WPCM (920 kHz) is a commercial AM radio station broadcasting a Contemporary Christian radio format. Licensed to Burlington-Graham, North Carolina, the station covers the Greensboro metropolitan area and part of the Raleigh-Durham metropolitan area.  It is owned by Alamance Media Partners and calls itself "Hope 104.5."  The studios and offices are on North Main Street in Kernersville, North Carolina.

By day, WPCM is powered at 5,000 watts non-directional.  But to avoid interference to other stations on 920 AM, at night it reduces power to only 55 watts.  The transmitter is on Tower Drive at West Front Street in Burlington.  Programming is also heard on FM translator 104.5 MHz W283BT in Burlington.

History
It was the first radio station in the City of Burlington and the first in Alamance County. The original call sign was WBBB. WBBB had its studios above Lamb's Clothing on South Main Street. It was a daytime-only station with 1,000 watts of power but required to go off the air at sunset. Its transmitter was on Tower Drive at the same location the station airs from today.  

In 1946, WBBB added an FM station at 101.3 (later 101.1).  It later became a separate station known as WNCB, then WPCM and it is currently WYMY.

In 1952, WBBB increased its power to 5,000 watts, but still as a daytimer. The WBBB call sign moved to an FM station in Raleigh in January 1998.

WBBB 920 later started a news/talk format that included Ken Hamblin and G. Gordon Liddy, switching its call letters to WPCM. Although the area had several country radio stations, WPCM began playing classic country by artists such as Dolly Parton, George Jones, Willie Nelson and Patsy Cline. The new slogan was "We Don't Forget Who Made Country Music Great."

By 2001, WPCM was playing oldies. In June 2004, WPCM changed its format from beach music. On May 14, 2005, WPCM went back to its beach music format, including operations manager/morning host Byron Tucker and afternoon DJ Charlie Brown.

In 2009, Brown became an honorary member of the Association of Beach and Shag Club DeeJays' DJ Hall of Fame.  In 2010, WPCM won the Carolina Beach Music Association's AM Station of the Year award for the third time in four years.

In 2014, WPCM added W236BO, an FM translator at 95.1 MHz which previously belonged to Liberty University. The music also changed but remained oldies.

On December 26, 2014, WPCM switched from oldies to country music.  Imaging promos on the air said "WPCM.  We Play Country Music."  The station's Facebook page  had this explanation:  "...Today we begin an exciting new chapter in our life as a radio station as we bring you the best in country music...." and "...Alamance County has a love of country music and it is our responsibility to the community and to ourselves to play the music that you want to hear and that our advertiser's clients want to hear...."

In 2018, WPCM switched to an all sports format, simulcast from co-owned AM 600 WSJS Winston-Salem.  The station went online at 5:00PM on Friday March 1, 2019.

In January 2022, it was announced that Curtis Media Group would sell WPCM and WMFR to Triad Media Partners. Curtis Media sold WSJS one month prior, meaning these stations were Curtis Media's last properties in the Piedmont Triad market.

On April 29, 2022, WPCM changed their format from sports to contemporary Christian, branded as "Hope 104.5".

References

External links
Curtis Media Stations

PCM
Radio stations established in 1941
1941 establishments in North Carolina
Contemporary Christian radio stations in the United States